René Ahumada Rodríguez (born 1935) is a Mexican sprinter. He competed in the men's 100 metres at the 1956 Summer Olympics.

References

External links
 

1935 births
Living people
Athletes (track and field) at the 1956 Summer Olympics
Mexican male sprinters
Olympic athletes of Mexico
Place of birth missing (living people)
Pan American Games medalists in athletics (track and field)
Pan American Games bronze medalists for Mexico
Athletes (track and field) at the 1955 Pan American Games
Medalists at the 1955 Pan American Games
20th-century Mexican people